Andreas "Andi" Gees (born June 1, 1975) is a Swiss bobsledder who competed from 1999 to 2006. He earned two Bobsleigh World Cup victories in the four-man event (December 2004 - Cortina d'Ampezzo, January 2005 - Cesana Pariol).

Gees also finished fourth in the four-man event at the 2005 FIBT World Championships in Calgary. He finished eighth in the four-man event at the 2006 Winter Olympics in Turin.

References
 FIBT profile
 

1975 births
Bobsledders at the 2006 Winter Olympics
Living people
Olympic bobsledders of Switzerland
Swiss male bobsledders
21st-century Swiss people